The British Rail Class 127 diesel multiple units were built by BR Derby in 1959. Thirty 4-car units were built, formed of two outer driving motor vehicles, sandwiching two intermediate trailers which were classified class 186. The technical description of such as 4-car unit was DMBS + TSL + TS + DMBS.

Numbering

Usage
The units were almost exclusively used on London St. Pancras to Bedford commuter services, which earned the class the nickname "Bed-Pan" units. The class was maintained at a new purpose-built depot at Cricklewood.

Powertrain
Unlike other "Heritage" DMU units, the class 127 units had hydraulic transmission (as opposed to the more standard mechanical transmission). 
The gear selector in the driver's cab had a "D" position where "4" would be on other standard transmission units.
As built, these units were coded Blue Square, and were therefore able to work with mechanical transmission units, provided the driver remembered to use 1,2,3,D instead of just selecting D.
This was changed to a unique code of Red Triangle when a driver forgot he had a mechanical transmission unit on the rear of his train, which meant this unit was driven only in fourth gear, which burnt out the transmissions on that unit.
Power was provided by C8NFLH engines supplied by Rolls-Royce. For further information on the powertrain see British Rail British United Traction.

Replacement

The class 127 units operated one of the most intensive passenger services worked by diesel multiple units and, by the late 1970s, it was clear they needed replacing. It was therefore decided to electrify the Bedford line and replace the Class 127 units with new Class 317 electric multiple units. The class 127 units should have been withdrawn by 1982, however, delays with the new trains meant they had to struggle on in service until July 1983.  This was largely due to an industrial dispute with the unions over Driver only operation, which resulted in the new electric trains being stored at Cricklewood depot for nearly a year, awaiting the resolution of the dispute.

From early 1983, they had commenced operations on the Gospel Oak to Barking line at first running in three-car then finally two-car formations from November 1983 with just the two power cars. The units lasted in service on this line until eventually being withdrawn in March 1984. The units were then stored at Carlisle depot pending reuse, preservation or scrapping. Subsequently, many trailer vehicles saw further use in combination with Class 116 units, based at Tyseley depot in Birmingham. These lasted until October 1993.

Rebuilding
In 1985, 22 redundant power cars, including the first built, no. 51591, were rebuilt to form 11 two-car parcels units. Vehicles were renumbered 55966-987, and formed into sets CH910 to CH920. Units were fitted with roller shutter doors, and were based at Chester depot. The units lasted in service until 1989, when they were withdrawn.

Preservation

Three units have been preserved on heritage railways, although only one of these contains a trailer vehicle.

References

Further reading

External links

Llangollen Railcar Group - owners of preserved DMUs on Llangollen Railway.
Midland Railway Trust Railcar Group - owners of 51591+59609+51625+51610.
History of the Class 127s

127
Train-related introductions in 1959